Ehrman Burkman Mitchell III FRAIA FRAIC (February 25, 1924 - 2005) was an American architect. He was born in Harrisburg, Pennsylvania in 1924 and graduated from The Hill School in 1941.  He then attended the University of Pennsylvania, graduating in 1948. In 1958, he co-founded Mitchell/Giurgola Architects with Romaldo Giurgola.

He served as president of the American Institute of Architects from 1979-1980.

References

The Hill School alumni
2005 deaths
1924 births
University of Pennsylvania School of Design alumni
People from Harrisburg, Pennsylvania